Saint-Martin-d'Écublei is a commune in the Orne department in north-western France.

The town of Saint-Martin d'Ecublei borders the department of Eure.

See also
Communes of the Orne department

References

Saintmartindecublei